Ronald Alexander Kiefel (born April 11, 1960 in Denver) is a former professional road bicycle racer from the United States. Kiefel is a seven-time Tour de France racer, Olympic bronze medalist and member of the United States Bicycling Hall of Fame.

Kiefel rode for American professional teams such as 7-Eleven, Motorola, Coors Light and Saturn. His wins included the 1985 Trofeo Laigueglia and the 1987 Tour of Tuscany.

He became the first American stage winner in a Grand Tour when he won stage 15 (from L'Aquila to Perugia) in the 1985 Giro d'Italia.

He competed in seven Tours de France, and represented the USA  at the 1984 Olympic Games, where he won bronze in the team time trial with Roy Knickman, Davis Phinney, and Andy Weaver.

In 1983 Kiefel won the USPRO road championship, the time trial and the team time trial. He was also road champion in 1988.  He retired from racing in 1996 and has since commentated on TV and radio for European classics and tours. He is a coach in Wheat Ridge, Colorado, vice president of Wheat Ridge Cyclery, and promotes races and rides.

In 2004, Kiefel was inducted in the United States Bicycling Hall of Fame. He and his wife, Meegan, at one time hosted a weekly AM radio show.

Major results

 Stage 15, Giro d'Italia (1985)
  National Road Race Champion (1983, 1988)
  National Time Trial Champion (1983)
  National Team Time Trial Champion (1983)
 Bronze Medal, Summer Olympics – Men's Team Time Trial (1984)

Year by year
1980
 5th, U.S. National Cyclocross Championships
1981
 5th, U.S. National Cyclocross Championships
1983
 1st, U.S. National Cycling Championships – Road Race
 1st, U.S. National Cycling Championships – Individual Time Trial
 1st, U.S. National Cycling Championships – Team Time Trial
1984
 3rd, Bronze Medal, Los Angeles Summer Olympics – Men's Team Time Trial
 9th, Los Angeles Summer Olympics – Men's Individual Road Race

1985
 1st, Trofeo Laigueglia (ITA)
 1st, Stage 15, Giro d'Italia (ITA)
 1st, Prologue, Coors Classic (USA)
1986
 1st, Prologue, Coors Classic (USA)
 1st, Stage 17, Coors Classic (USA)
1987
 1st, Los Gatos Cat's Hill Classic (USA)
1988
 1st, Overall, Tour of Tuscany (ITA)
 1st, U.S. National Cycling Championships – Road Race
1989
 1st, Stage 10, Tour de Trump (USA)
 6th, Overall, Tour de Trump (USA)
1990
 2nd, Stage 10, Tour de Trump (USA)
 3rd, Stage 8, Tour de France
1993
 1st, Los Gatos Cat's Hill Classic (USA)

Tour de France
 1986 – 96th
 1987 – 82nd
 1988 – 69th
 1989 – 73rd
 1990 – 83rd
 1991 – 138th

Teams
 1985 – 7 Eleven
 1986 – 7 Eleven
 1987 – 7 Eleven
 1988 – 7 Eleven
 1989 – 7 Eleven
 1990 – 7 Eleven-Hoonved
 1991 – Motorola
 1992 – Motorola
 1993 – Coors Light
 1994 – Coors Light
 1995 – Saturn

References

External links
 
 

1960 births
Living people
American male cyclists
American cycling road race champions
Cyclists at the 1984 Summer Olympics
Olympic bronze medalists for the United States in cycling
American Giro d'Italia stage winners
Sportspeople from Denver
Medalists at the 1984 Summer Olympics